Stephen Shen (born 19 June 1949) is a Taiwanese politician. He was the Minister of the Environmental Protection Administration (EPA) of the Executive Yuan from 2008 to 2014.

Education
Shen obtained his bachelor's degree, master's degree and doctoral degree in chemical engineering from National Taiwan University in 1971, 1975 and 1982 respectively.

EPA Ministry

Nuclear energy over coal energy
In March 2013, commenting on the uncertainty regarding the completion of Taiwan's 4th nuclear power plant, the Lungmen Nuclear Power Plant, Shen said that by abolishing nuclear power plant, means Taiwan has to replace it with more coal-fired power plants, which means it will create more carbon emission to the environment and it would make Taiwan not being able to achieve its carbon reduction goal in 2020. While renewable energy is good to replace carbon-based power generation, renewable energy is still expensive and is not economical as coal, especially when it comes to electricity generation. He added that having nuclear power plant is safer compared to more coal-fired power plants because nuclear energy can be controlled, while severe climate change due to excessive carbon emission cannot be controlled at all.

LNG supply to Kinmen from Mainland China
In January 2013, Shen witnessed the signing of agreement between China National Offshore Oil Corporation and Shinfox to supply Kinmen with liquefied natural gas (LNG) from Mainland China. The delivery of LNG was expected to be started in early 2015 to industrial companies. At a later stage, the supply would be increased up to 100,000 tonnes per year to include power plants and households. Shen said that the cooperation is helpful to aid Taiwan in realizing Kinmen to be a tourism-focused low-carbon county.

References

1949 births
Living people
Taiwanese Ministers of Environment
National Taiwan University alumni